Salvador Goldschmied (born 19 October 1940) is a Mexican judoka. He competed in the men's heavyweight event at the 1964 Summer Olympics.

References

1940 births
Living people
Mexican male judoka
Olympic judoka of Mexico
Judoka at the 1964 Summer Olympics
Place of birth missing (living people)